Lobing may refer to
 Acoustic lobing, radiation pattern exhibited by multi-driver loudspeakers
 Lobe (disambiguation), for the various uses of the term lobe